Jesús Rueda is the name of:

Jesús Rueda (composer) (born 1961), Spanish composer
Jesús Rueda (footballer) (born 1987), Spanish footballer